In biochemistry, intercalation is the insertion of molecules between the planar bases of deoxyribonucleic acid (DNA).  This process is used as a method for analyzing DNA and it is also the basis of certain kinds of poisoning.

There are several ways molecules (in this case, also known as ligands) can interact with DNA. Ligands may interact with DNA by covalently binding, electrostatically binding, or intercalating. Intercalation occurs when ligands of an appropriate size and chemical nature fit themselves in between base pairs of DNA.  These ligands are mostly polycyclic, aromatic, and planar, and therefore often make good nucleic acid stains. Intensively studied DNA intercalators include berberine, ethidium bromide, proflavine, daunomycin, doxorubicin, and thalidomide. DNA intercalators are used in chemotherapeutic treatment to inhibit DNA replication in rapidly growing cancer cells. Examples include doxorubicin (adriamycin) and daunorubicin (both of which are used in treatment of Hodgkin's lymphoma), and dactinomycin (used in Wilm's tumour, Ewing's Sarcoma, rhabdomyosarcoma).

Metallointercalators are complexes of a metal cation with polycyclic aromatic ligands. The most commonly used metal ion is ruthenium(II), because its complexes are very slow to decompose in the biological environment. Other metallic cations that have been used include rhodium(III) and iridium(III). Typical ligands attached to the metal ion are dipyridine and terpyridine whose planar structure is ideal for intercalation.
      
In order for an intercalator to fit between base pairs, the DNA must dynamically open a space between its base pairs by unwinding. The degree of unwinding varies depending on the intercalator; for example, ethidium cation (the ionic form of ethidium bromide found in aqueous solution) unwinds DNA by about 26°, whereas proflavine unwinds it by about 17°. This unwinding causes the base pairs to separate, or "rise", creating an opening of about 0.34 nm (3.4 Å). This unwinding induces local structural changes to the DNA strand, such as lengthening of the DNA strand or twisting of the base pairs. These structural modifications can lead to functional changes, often to the inhibition of transcription and replication and DNA repair processes, which makes intercalators potent mutagens.  For this reason, DNA intercalators are often carcinogenic, such as the exo (but not the endo) 8,9 epoxide of aflatoxin B1 and acridines such as proflavine or quinacrine.

Intercalation as a mechanism of interaction between cationic, planar, polycyclic aromatic systems of the correct size (on the order of a base pair) was first proposed by Leonard Lerman in 1961. One proposed mechanism of intercalation is as follows: In aqueous isotonic solution, the cationic intercalator is attracted electrostatically to the surface of the polyanionic DNA. The ligand displaces a sodium and/or magnesium cation present in the "condensation cloud" of such cations that surrounds DNA (to partially balance the sum of the negative charges carried by each phosphate oxygen), thus forming a weak electrostatic association with the outer surface of DNA. From this position, the ligand diffuses along the surface of the DNA and may slide into the hydrophobic environment found between two base pairs that may transiently "open" to form an intercalation site, allowing the ethidium to move away from the hydrophilic (aqueous) environment surrounding the DNA and into the intercalation site. The base pairs transiently form such openings due to energy absorbed during collisions with solvent molecules.

See also 
 Anthracycline
 Intercalation (chemistry)
 Molecular tweezers
 Twisted intercalating nucleic acid

References

Supramolecular chemistry